Elkhart Lake may refer to:

Places
 Elkhart Lake, Wisconsin, a village and a lake in the US
 Elkhart Lake-Glenbeulah High School, Elkhart Lake, Wisconsin, US
 Road America, a motorsports racetrack near Elkhart Lake, Wisconsin, US, also known as Elkhart Lake

Other uses
 Elkhart Lake (microprocessor), an Intel CPU microarchitecture

See also

 Elkhart (disambiguation)
 Elk Lake (disambiguation)
 Hart Lake (disambiguation)